Hard 2 B-Legit is the fourth album by B-Legit. It was released on September 24, 2002 by Koch Records and was produced by B-Legit, E-A-Ski, Rick Rock and Studio Ton. The album peaked at #111 on the Billboard 200, #17 on the Top R&B/Hip-Hop Albums and #6 on the Independent Albums

Track listing
"I'm Singlin'" (featuring Rick Rock & Harm) - 3:45
"If You Don't Know Me" - 3:39 
"Whatcha Talkin'" (featuring Harm) - 4:10
"Bag Habit" (featuring Rick Rock) - 2:59
"1 Dame" (featuring Harm) - 3:47
"Luv 2 Get High" (featuring Young Buck & Skip) - 4:30
"Fo' Real" (featuring Yountie) - 4:04
"So International" (featuring Too Short) - 3:34
"What U Thought" (featuring Suga Free) - 3:46
"Play 2 Much" (featuring Ray J) - 4:06
"Straight Fool" (featuring E-40) - 3:52
"Keep It Movin'" (featuring Harm & J' Rilla) - 3:48
"We Get Dough" (featuring Harm) - 3:54
"Feelin'" (featuring Levitti) - 4:23

References

External links 
 Hard 2 B-Legit at Discogs

B-Legit albums
2002 albums
E1 Music albums
Albums produced by Rick Rock
Albums produced by Studio Ton
Sick Wid It Records albums